LTV Ethiopia is an Ethiopian satellite television channel owned and started by Gemechis Buba. It was created for the purpose of spreading the Ethiopian culture to the world through its programming and to fill the lack of  private channels in Ethiopia.

History
LTV Ethiopia was launched in June 2016. After several month of test broadcasting, regular programming commenced in the spring of 2017. Soon after launching, LTV was named as one of the four channels implicated by the Ethiopian Broadcasting Authority for operating in the country without a proper local license.

Programming 
 LTV Show - Interviews of prominent Ethiopians 
 Made in Ethiopia - showcasing the best in Ethiopian creation 
 LTV News - New Program focused on the current events
 Ethio Planet - Documentary style nature program 
 Niud  
 Let's go with Meti - travel program hosted by Meti 
 Lebamoch  
 Diplomacy  
 Wedefit

Ownership
LTV Ethiopia is a US-based company owned by Dr. Gemechis Buba.

References 

2017 establishments in Ethiopia
Television channels and stations established in 2017
Television channels in Ethiopia
Satellite television